Broken Promise is a 1981 American made-for-television drama film starring Chris Sarandon.

Cast
Chris Sarandon as Bud Griggs
Melissa Michaelsen as Patty Clawson
George Coe as George Mathews
McKee Anderson as Nancy Sloan
David Haskell as Tom Parks
Sondra West as Alice Parks
Marc Alaimo as Joe Clawson

References

External links
Broken Promise at IMDb
Broken Promise at TCMDB
Broken Promise at BFI

1981 television films
1981 films
1981 drama films
CBS network films
Films directed by Don Taylor
American drama television films
1980s American films
1980s English-language films